Selamin(), also known as Tzalmon, Selame, Salamis / Salamin, Zalmon, and Khurbet es Salâmeh (the Ruin of Salameh), was a Jewish village in Lower Galilee during the Second Temple period, formerly fortified by Josephus, and which was captured by the Roman Imperial army in circa 64 CE. Today, the ruin is designated as a historical site and lies directly south of the Wadi Zalmon National Park in Israel's Northern District.

German orientalist E.G. Schultz was the first to identify the site in 1847. The site today is directly adjacent to the Bedouin village (formerly a Druze village), Sallama, towards the village's southeast, situated on a spur of a hill near Mount Salameh (now Har Tzalmon), on the eastern bank of Wady es Salameh ("Valley of Salameh"), or what is known in Hebrew as Nahal Tzalmon. The valley runs in a northerly-southerly direction, deriving its name from Khurbet es Salameh, the said ruin of Selamin (Salamis) which formerly crowned a strong and extensive site. A road accessed by 4-wheel-drive vehicle passes by the site.

Background
The Jewish population of Selamin in the 1st century-CE consisted of a sacerdotal tribe linked to the course of Dalaiah, mentioned in the apocryphal roster of Second Temple priests and their respective villages, and who were first named in a poem composed by Killir (c. 570 – c. 640). Historical geographer, Klein, thinks that one of the Jewish priests who died in the conflagration during the Second Temple's destruction, Joseph b. Dalaiah, hailed from this village. The Jewish villagers of the town were most-likely farmers, as the Mishnah mentions it being a place of vineyards interspersed between planted vegetables.

The village is also mentioned in the Tosefta (Parah 9:2), a sequel to the Mishnah (compiled in 189 CE), where it is said to have had a natural spring which ceased to flow during the Roman siege of the town. It was in Selamin where a man cried out that he had been bitten by a poisonous snake and that he was dying. When he died, his visage was so changed thereby that they could not recognise him. Even so, on the basis of his own testimony that he was dying from a snakebite, the rabbis permitted his widow to remarry - even though they could not discern the face of the dead, or what is known as "circumstantial evidence".

Israeli historian Bezalel Bar-Kochva thinks that the strategic importance of the site was in its geographical location, where it blocked one of the routes leading from the Phoenician territory to the eastern plateau of Lower Galilee. However, its choice as a defensive location for a fortress would scarcely make sense, seeing, in his view, it had an exposed and inferior position. In 1875, Victor Guérin visited the site where he found the remains of a rectangular enclosure, 80 x 50 paces in circumference, as well as two presses cut in the rock. The site today is fenced-off and primarily used to keep cattle. A pool made of old masonry is still shown by locals on the ancient ruin.

The inhabitants of Selamin who fought against the Imperial Roman army during the First Jewish Revolt are believed to have capitulated to the Roman army after the fall of Tarichaea.

Archaeology
The site has yet to be excavated. According to Mordechai Aviam of the Institute for Galilean Archaeology at the University of Rochester who surveyed the site, "There is only a narrow saddle connecting the hill to the north-west, and it is clearly cut by a moat. On the western slope, one can see a segment of a wide wall, perhaps the remains of a defending wall." Pottery and coins were found in situ.

Gallery

References

Bibliography

 (Hebrew)

  (Hebrew)

 Josephus, De Bello Judaico (The Jewish War)

 (via JSTOR)

External links
Kh. Sellâmeh, shown in Survey of Western Palestine, Map 6: IAA,  Wikimedia commons

Ancient villages in Israel
Former populated places in Israel
Ancient Jewish history
Judea (Roman province)
Historic Jewish communities
60s disestablishments in the Roman Empire
Tells (archaeology)
Ancient Jewish settlements of Galilee
Fortifications in Israel
Historic sites in Israel
Geography of Northern District (Israel)